Lee Dong-ryul (born 9 June 2000) is a South Korean footballer currently playing as a forward for Seoul E-Land.

Career statistics

Club

Notes

Honours 
LJeju United
 K League 2: 2020

Individual
 K League Young Player of the Year (K League 2): 2020

References

External links
 

2000 births
Living people
South Korean footballers
South Korea youth international footballers
Association football forwards
K League 1 players
K League 2 players
Jeju United FC players
Seoul E-Land FC players